Garnet Point is a rocky coastal point consisting of garnet gneiss, located at the west side of the entrance to Watt Bay, in the George V Coast area of Antarctica. Garnet Point was discovered by the Australasian Antarctic Expedition (1911–14) under Douglas Mawson, and named by that expedition's geological party led by Frank L. Stillwell.

References

Headlands of George V Land